Wadi al-Maqab is a sub-district located in Hubaysh District, Ibb Governorate, Yemen. Wadi al-Maqab had a population of 4863 according to the 2004 census.

References 

Sub-districts in Hubaysh District